All Saints' Episcopal Church is a historic Episcopal church located at 18 Olive Avenue, Lewes and Rehoboth Hundred in Rehoboth Beach, Sussex County, Delaware.  It was built in 1893 for the summer services of an Episcopal congregation.  It is a one-story structure constructed of hand-molded brick, measuring 100 feet by 30 feet.  It features board-and-batten wainscotting, fishscale shingled gable ends, ribbon windows, and a low-pitched gable roof in the Arts and Crafts style. The church was renovated after a fire in 1938.  It is joined with St. George's Chapel, Lewes in the Episcopal Parish of All Saints’ Church & St. George's Chapel.

It was added to the National Register of Historic Places in 1991.

References

External links
All Saints' Episcopal Church & St. George’s Chapel website

Episcopal church buildings in Delaware
Churches on the National Register of Historic Places in Delaware
Churches completed in 1893
19th-century Episcopal church buildings
Churches in Sussex County, Delaware
Rehoboth Beach, Delaware
National Register of Historic Places in Sussex County, Delaware